Jules Coste, called Coste-Labaume, (7 August 1840 – 9 September 1910) (was a 19th-century French journalist and playwright. His pen name was Marius Canard. He was made chevalier of the Légion d'honneur (6 February 1897) and promoted officier (15 January 1908).

Works 
 1883 : Guignol député
 1887: L'instruction obligatoire
 1892: Aux environs de Lyon

References

External links 
 Jules Coste on data.bnf.fr

People from Lyon Metropolis
1840 births
1910 deaths
19th-century French journalists
French male journalists
19th-century French dramatists and playwrights
Officiers of the Légion d'honneur
19th-century French male writers